Santiago Metro Line 1 is the oldest of the seven existing rapid transit lines that make up the Santiago Metro system. Being its busiest, it has a total of 27 stations along its  length, constructed almost entirely underground (save for some open cut sections in the west), and is located primarily along the axis formed by the Avenida Libertador General Bernardo O'Higgins (Libertador General Bernardo O'Higgins Avenue, also known as the “Alameda”), Providencia Avenue and Apoquindo Avenue.

In 2015, Line 1 accounted for 39.5% of all trips made on the metro system with a daily ridership of 705,200, making it the busiest line in the system. It currently connects with five of the six other lines – with Line 2 at Los Héroes station, with Line 3 at Universidad de Chile station, with Line 4 at Tobalaba station in the northeast, with Line 5 at both San Pablo station and Baquedano station and line 6 at Los Leones. There are plans for connections with the future  Line 9 at Santa Lucía station, the future Line 7 at Baquedano and Pedro de Valdivia and the future Line 8 at Los Leones. Its distinctive colour on the network map is red.

During the 2019 Chilean protests, several of the stations were burned and  looted, with the closure of the entire system following soon afterwards. Since then, all of the stations have reopened.

History
The line was inaugurated on September 15, 1975, with an initial  of track running from San Pablo station to La Moneda station. In 1977, the line was extended  to the east to Salvador station. Then, in 1980, seven more stations opened to the east between Salvador and Escuela Militar. On January 7, 2010, three final stations opened to the east of Escuela Militar: Manquehue, Hernando de Magallanes and Los Dominicos.

1986 terrorist attack
One of the most memorable and tragic events in the history of the Santiago Metro was the June 16, 1986 terrorist attack, which took place on Line 1. At 6:56 a.m., the Manuel Rodríguez Patriotic Front, a group opposed to the government of General Pinochet, attacked Tobalaba station with C4 bombs. The bombs exploded and caused the death of one passenger, injured another six, and left one NS-74 train destroyed. Because of this, Metro S.A. (the company that operates the Santiago Metro) decided to replace that trainset, however Alsthom Groupe Brissonneau wasn't producing trains at a fast enough rate, so the company turned their attention towards Concarril, who supplied the Santiago Metro with one NS-88 trainset as a replacement. The destroyed train remained out of service until it was rebuilt by Santiago Metro workers between February 27, 1989 and December 14, 1990, going back into circulation in 1990. The train now bears a commemorative plaque for the attack and its reconstruction.

October 2019 protests

A series of protests in October 2019 resulted in major damage to the metro network. Line 1 (which suffered a minor amount of damage compared to lines 4 and 5) was closed on the weekend of October 18 of that year, and resumed partial service two days later between Pajaritos and Los Dominicos; full service was expected to resume in the first half of 2020. San Pablo, Neptuno, and Baquedano stations suffered moderate damage in the protests, and as a result those three stations would temporarily close (resulting in an ability to transfer between lines 1 and 5). However, the Baquedano station has remained closed to the public since the beginning of the protests, however On April 8, 2020, the combination of both lines was enabled, with their accesses closed until May 4 of the same year. Finally, Line 1 was fully operational again on July 25, 2020, with the reopening of the San Pablo and Neptuno stations.

Future
After the announcement of the line 7, it is proposed to extend the line 1 northwards to connect with the line 7 and ending at this point.

Requests have been made by local residents, authorities and the communal mayor for an extension to the commune of Cerro Navia towards Avenida Carrascal (Carrascal Avenue) and the hospital planned for construction in this commune. Although no expansion project has yet begun, studies are being carried for an extension through Cerro Navia.

Requests have been made by local residents, authorities and the communal mayor for an extension to the commune of Las Condes towards Avenida El Alba and the extension for construction in this commune.

Communes served by Line 1

Line 1 serves the following Santiago communes from west to east:

 Lo Prado
 Estación Central
 Santiago
 Providencia
 Las Condes

Stations 
The Line 1 stations (eastbound order) are:

Line 1 data sheet 
 Terminal Communes:Lo Prado – Las Condes
 Track:
 Neptuno Avenue: 2 Stations
 General Oscar Bonilla Avenue: 1 station
 Libertador Bernardo O'Higgins Avenue: 13 stations
 Providencia Avenue: 2 stations
 Nueva Providencia Avenue: 2 stations
 Apoquindo Avenue: 7 stations
 Construction Method:
 San Pablo: open-cut.
 San Pablo - Neptuno section: underground.
 Neptuno: open-cut.
 Neptuno - Pajaritos section: underground.
 Pajaritos: open-cut.
 Pajaritos – Los Dominicos: Underground.
 Opening Dates:
 San Pablo – La Moneda: September 1975.
 La Moneda – Salvador: March 1977.
 Salvador – Escuela Militar: August 1980.
 Escuela Militar – Los Dominicos: January 2010.

See also 
 List of metro systems
 Rail transport in Chile
 Transantiago
 Rubber-tyred metro

References

External links

 Metro S.A.
 UrbanRail.net/Santiago
 Santiago Metro Track Map
 Tarjeta Bip!
 Plan and Authority of Transit of Santiago de Chile, Transantiago

 
1975 establishments in Chile
Railway lines opened in 1975
750 V DC railway electrification